The John Sinclair Freedom Rally was a protest and concert in response to the imprisonment of John Sinclair for possession of marijuana held on December 10, 1971, in the Crisler Arena at the University of Michigan in Ann Arbor, Michigan. The event was filmed and released as Ten For Two.

The reason behind the concert was the sentencing of Sinclair, who was given ten years in prison for the possession of two marijuana cigarettes. Shortly after the event, Sinclair was released.

Musical performers

John Lennon 
Yoko Ono
Phil Ochs
The Up
Commander Cody and His Lost Planet Airmen
Bob Seger
Stevie Wonder
Archie Shepp
Joy of Cooking
David Peel
Teegarden & Van Winkle

Speakers

Bobby Seale
Jerry Rubin
Allen Ginsberg
Rennie Davis
James Groppi
Sheila Murphy
Johnnie Tillmon
Ed Sanders
Jane Fonda

See also
Cannabis laws in Ann Arbor, Michigan

References

Further reading

External links
Ann Arbor District Library - Freeing John Sinclair: The Day Legends Came To Town.
John Sinclair Freedom Rally graphics. Event posters and flyers.
John Sinclair Freedom Rally

1971 in Michigan
1971 in cannabis
Cannabis in Michigan
Cannabis law reform in the United States
Protests in the United States